Group B of the 2011 CONCACAF Gold Cup was one of three groups of the 2011 CONCACAF Gold Cup. It consisted of Grenada, Guatemala, Honduras and Jamaica. The group's first round of matches were played on June 6, with the final round played on June 13. All six group matches were played at venues in the United States, in Carson, California; Miami, Florida and Harrison, New Jersey.

Standings

All Times are U.S. Eastern Daylight Time (UTC−4) (Local times in parentheses)

Jamaica vs Grenada

Honduras vs Guatemala

Jamaica vs Guatemala

Grenada vs Honduras

Guatemala vs Grenada

Honduras vs Jamaica

External links
 

B